Lepidochrysops jansei, the Janse's blue, is a butterfly in the family Lycaenidae. It is found in south-central Kenya and northern Tanzania. The habitat consists of areas with short grass and flowers of the family Lamiaceae, often on shallow soils on a rock substratum.

Adults are on wing in November and April.

The larvae feed on Lamiaceae species.

References

Butterflies described in 1957
Lepidochrysops